2520 (two thousand five hundred twenty) is the natural number following 2519 and preceding 2521.

In mathematics
2520 is:
the smallest number divisible by all integers from 1 to 10, i.e., it is their least common multiple.
half of 7! (5040), meaning 7 factorial, or 1×2×3×4×5×6×7.
the product of five consecutive numbers, namely 3×4×5×6×7.
a superior highly composite number.
a colossally abundant number.
the last highly composite number which is half of the next highly composite number.
the last highly composite number that is a divisor of all following highly composite numbers.
palindromic in bases 11 (199111), and a repdigit in bases 55, 59 and 62.
a Harshad number in bases 2, 3, 4, 5, 6, 7, 8, 9, 10, 11, 12, 13, 14, 15 and 16.
the aliquot sum of 1080.
part of the 53-aliquot tree. The complete aliquot sequence starting at 1080 is: 1080, 2520, 6840, 16560, 41472, 82311, 27441, 12209, 451, 53, 1, 0.

Factors 

The factors, also called divisors, of 2520 are:

1, 2, 3, 4, 5, 6, 7, 8, 9, 10, 12, 14, 15, 18, 20, 21, 24, 28, 30, 35, 36, 40, 42, 45, 56, 60, 63, 70, 72, 84, 90, 105, 120, 126, 140, 168, 180, 210, 252, 280, 315, 360, 420, 504, 630, 840, 1260, 2520.

References 

Integers